Jordanville railway station is located on the Glen Waverley line in Victoria, Australia. It serves the eastern Melbourne suburb of Mount Waverley, and opened on 5 May 1930 as Kabbareng. Just over a week later, on 13 May, it was renamed Jordanville.

The station also serves the adjacent Riversdale Golf Club.

History
Jordanville station opened on 5 May 1930, when the railway line from East Malvern was extended to Glen Waverley. It was named after the Jordan family, particularly John Jordan, an early settler and shire councillor. The original name of the station, Kabbareng, is an Indigenous word meaning "upper". The name was controversial, as evidenced by a letter sent to the editor of The Argus, on 4 March 1930, using the pseudonym "Anti-Kabbareng". An article in The Age, on 21 March 1930, stated that: "At the last meeting of the Mulgrave Council indignation was expressed at the name of Kabbareng being selected for the railway station at Box Hill-road on the new Darling-Glen Waverley line. The council’s recommendation was Jordan. It was decided to ask the district Parliamentary representatives to take up the matter in support of the name selected by the council."

In 1964, the current island platform was provided, when the line between East Malvern and Mount Waverley was duplicated.

From the time the station opened until the creation of the City of Monash in 1994, Jordanville was a suburb of Melbourne. However, it is now considered a "residential locality", with the former suburban area now shared between the suburbs of Chadstone and Ashwood.

Platforms and services
Jordanville has one island platform with two faces. It is served by Glen Waverley line trains.

Platform 1:
  all stations and limited express services to Flinders Street

Platform 2:
  all stations services to Glen Waverley

Transport links
Ventura Bus Lines operates one route via Jordanville station, under contract to Public Transport Victoria:
 : Westfield Southland – Box Hill station

Gallery

References

External links
 Melway map at street-directory.com.au

Railway stations in Melbourne
Railway stations in Australia opened in 1930
Railway stations in the City of Monash